Jujeh kabab (literally "grilled chick") is an Iranian dish that consists of grilled chunks of chicken which are sometimes with bone and other times without bone. It is one of the most common and popular dishes of Iran. It is common to marinate the chunks in minced onion, lemon juice and saffron. 

It is sometimes spelled as Joojay kebob or Joojeh kabab. Often served on chelo rice or wrapped in lavash bread, both of which are staples in the Iranian cuisine. The former is more often served in restaurants and elaborate parties such as wedding receptions while the latter is often eaten in domestic settings, kebab joints and picnics or packed for road trips. Other optional components include grilled tomatoes, peppers (grilled or raw), fresh lemons or other vegetables.

See also
 Shish kebab
 Shish taouk

References

External links
 
 Jūjeh-kabāb Recipe
 Jouje kabab Recipe (in Persian)

Skewered kebabs
Middle Eastern grilled meats
Iranian cuisine
Chicken dishes